Sinclair Imrie Miller  (13 October 1926  6 August 2019), known as Mick Miller, was an Australian police officer. Miller served as Chief Commissioner of Victoria Police—the police force of the Australian state of Victoria—from 1977 to 1987.

While Chief Commissioner, Miller introduced initiatives such as the air wing, task force policing and the Special Operations Group. Miller also integrated women into the police force by placing them on the general seniority list, thus giving them enhanced career opportunities.

Earlier in his career, Miller was appointed to lead the Gaming Branch in an operation against illegal SP bookmaking operations that had encouraged corruption both in the police force and the Postmaster-General's Department. Miller was the first Australian police officer to graduate from the FBI Academy and was awarded a Churchill Fellowship.

Honours and awards

Personal life
Miller attended Melbourne High School in 1940 and 1941. He enlisted in the Australian Army in January 1945 and served in World War Two. He also served in the 1st Armoured Car Squadron in the occupation of Japan.

Miller died in 2019. He was married to Beverley Smith for 55 years, with whom he had three children.

References

External links
Police Association magazine profile

1926 births
2019 deaths
Chief Commissioners of Victoria Police
Police officers from Melbourne
Lieutenants of the Royal Victorian Order
Officers of the Order of Australia
Australian recipients of the Queen's Police Medal
Recipients of the Australian Sports Medal
Knights of the Order of Merit of the Italian Republic
Australian Army personnel of World War II
People from Flemington, Victoria
Military personnel from Melbourne
People educated at Melbourne High School